Musical Atlas is a series of recordings of traditional music that was made for the International Music Council by the International Institute for Comparative Music Studies and Documentation (Berlin/Venice) and released on the EMI/Odeon label. The series was directed by Alain Daniélou.  It was part of the larger UNESCO Collection series.  Most of the recordings were later re-issued on the Naive/Auvidis label.

Recordings

References

External links
 Unesco Collection: Musical Atlas Records Listing

Traditional music